Timeline of anthropology, 1870–1879

Events
1873
 The American Museum of Natural History establishes an anthropology department

Publications
1871
 Systems of Consanguinity and Affinity of the Human Family

Births
1873
Leo Frobenius
Arnold van Gennep
Charles Seligman
John Reed Swanton

Deaths
1873
Louis Agassiz

Anthropology by decade
Anthropology
Anthropology timelines
1870s decade overviews